Thomas Edward Myers (February 9, 1901 – July 1, 1944) was an American football back who played two seasons in the National Football League with the New York Giants and Brooklyn Lions.  He played college football at Fordham University and attended Mahanoy City High School in Mahanoy City, Pennsylvania. Myers died as a result of an illness.

References

External links
Just Sports Stats

1901 births
1944 deaths
Players of American football from Connecticut
American football running backs
Fordham Rams football players
New York Giants players
Brooklyn Lions players
Sportspeople from New Britain, Connecticut